The Independent High Authority for Elections (or ISIE ) is a government agency in charge of organizing and supervising elections and referendums in Tunisia.

References

Tunisia
Independent constitutional authorities of Tunisia
Government agencies established in 2011
2011 establishments in Tunisia
Elections in Tunisia